Bernard Rooney (born 3 May 1943) is a Scottish former football player and manager.

Playing career

Rooney played for Celtic as a youth and was a contemporary of the group of players who would form the core of their Lisbon Lions team, but was unable to break into the team in the face of such stiff competition for a place, and after being loaned out to the junior leagues and to Dumbarton, he was allowed to sign for Dundee United on a free transfer in 1963. He was frequently relegated to United's reserve team, however, and he was eventually sold to St Johnstone in 1966 for £3,500. 

Rooney served the Perth club for nearly a decade during a very successful period for the club under the management of Willie Ormond. Rooney was the club's captain during their UEFA Cup run of 1971–72, when they defeated Hamburg and Vasas Budapest. He also had the honour of being captain for Saints''' first ever national final when they were unlucky to lose 1–0 to a Celtic side who were among the very best in Europe at the time in the Scottish League Cup Final at Hampden Park in 1969. As a key member of the Ormond era, Rooney has a place in St Johnstone history and will always be well remembered by the fans.

Managerial career

Rooney was appointed manager of Morton in 1976. Morton were part-time and competing in the First Division at the time. In his second season in charge he led the club to promotion to the Scottish Premier Division. In the 1979–80 season Morton famously topped the Premier Division in the middle of the season, and ultimately finished in 6th place, quite an achievement for a part-time club.

Rooney is also revered by Morton fans for assembling a memorable squad, including fan favourite Andy Ritchie, who was brought to Cappielow from Celtic in 1976.

Rooney left Morton in 1983, and went on to manage Partick Thistle and Albion Rovers, before returning to his first club Celtic briefly as a coach.

Personal life 
Benny has two children with wife Marion. His son Kevin is an actor, whilst his father Bob had been physiotherapist at Celtic in the successful Jock Stein managerial era at the club.

Rooney’s great nephew Shaun Rooney is also a footballer. He emulated his great uncle by playing for St Johnstone in the February 2021 Scottish League Cup Final, scoring the only goal of the game; he also scored the winning goal in the 2021 Scottish Cup Final three months later.

References

External links

Profile at Sons Archive''

Scottish footballers
Celtic F.C. players
Dundee United F.C. players
St Johnstone F.C. players
Partick Thistle F.C. players
Greenock Morton F.C. non-playing staff
Scottish Football League players
Scottish football managers
Greenock Morton F.C. managers
Partick Thistle F.C. managers
Albion Rovers F.C. managers
Celtic F.C. non-playing staff
Living people
1943 births
Scottish Football League managers
Footballers from Glasgow
People educated at Our Lady's High School, Motherwell 
Sportspeople from Cambuslang
Dumbarton F.C. players
Cambuslang Rangers F.C. players
Petershill F.C. players
Scottish Junior Football Association players
Association football defenders
Footballers from South Lanarkshire